The following outline is provided as an overview of and topical guide to Mali:

Mali – landlocked sovereign country located in West Africa.  Mali is the seventh most extensive country in Africa, bordering Algeria on the north, Niger on the east, Burkina Faso and the Côte d'Ivoire on the south, Guinea on the south-west, and Senegal and Mauritania on the west.

Consisting of eight regions, Mali's borders on the north reach deep into the middle of the Sahara, while the country's southern region, where the majority of inhabitants live, features the Niger and Senegal rivers. The country's economic structure centers around agriculture and fishing. Some of Mali's natural resources include gold, uranium, and salt. Due to a high incidence of poverty, Mali is considered to be one of the poorest nations in the world.

Present-day Mali was once part of three West African empires that controlled trans-Saharan trade: the Ghana Empire, the Mali Empire (from which Mali is named), and the Songhai Empire. In the late 19th century, Mali fell under French control, becoming part of French Sudan. Mali gained independence in 1959 with Senegal, as the Mali Federation in 1959. A year later, the Mali Federation became the independent nation of Mali in 1960.  After a long period of one-party rule, a 1991 coup led to the writing of a new constitution and the establishment of Mali as a democratic, multi-party state.

General reference 

 Pronunciation: 
 Common English country name:  Mali
 Official English country name:  The Republic of Mali
 Common endonym(s):  
 Official endonym(s):  
 Adjectival(s): Malian
 Demonym(s):
 Etymology: Name of Mali
 ISO country codes:  ML, MLI, 466
 ISO region codes:  See ISO 3166-2:ML
 Internet country code top-level domain:  .ml

Geography of Mali 

Geography of Mali
 Mali is: a landlocked country
 Population of Mali: 12,337,000  - 71st most populous country
 Area of Mali: 1,240,192 km2
 Atlas of Mali

Location 
 Mali is situated within the following regions:
 Northern Hemisphere and lies on the Prime Meridian
 Africa
 North Africa
 West Africa
 partially within the Sahara Desert
 Time zone:  Coordinated Universal Time UTC+00
 Extreme points of Mali
 High:  Hombori Tondo 
 Low:  Senegal River 
 Land boundaries:  7,243 km
 2,237 km
 1,376 km
 1,000 km
 858 km
 821 km
 532 km
 419 km
 Coastline:  none

Environment of Mali 

Environment of Mali
 Climate of Mali
 Environmental issues in Mali
 Wildlife of Mali
 Fauna of Mali
 Birds of Mali
 Mammals of Mali

Natural geographic features of Mali 

 Glaciers in Mali: none 
 Rivers of Mali
 World Heritage Sites in Mali

Regions of Mali

Ecoregions of Mali 

List of ecoregions in Mali

Administrative divisions of Mali 

Administrative divisions of Mali
 Regions of Mali
 Cercles of Mali
 Arrondissements of Mali
 Communes of Mali

Regions of Mali 

Regions of Mali

Cercles of Mali 

Cercles of Mali

Arrondissements of Mali 

Arrondissements of Mali

Communes of Mali 

Communes of Mali

Municipalities of Mali 

 Capital of Mali: Bamako
 Cities of Mali

Demography of Mali 

Demographics of Mali

Government and politics of Mali 

Politics of Mali
 Form of government: presidential representative democratic republic
 Capital of Mali: Bamako
 Elections in Mali
 Political parties in Mali

Branches of the government of Mali 

Government of Mali

Executive branch of the government of Mali 
 Head of state: President of Mali,
 Head of government: Prime Minister of Mali,
 Cabinet of Mali

Legislative branch of the government of Mali 

 Parliament of Mali (bicameral)
 Upper house: Senate of Mali
 Lower house: House of Commons of Mali

Judicial branch of the government of Mali 

Court system of Mali

Foreign relations of Mali 

Foreign relations of Mali
 Diplomatic missions in Mali
 Diplomatic missions of Mali

International organization membership 
The Republic of Mali is a member of:

African, Caribbean, and Pacific Group of States (ACP)
African Development Bank Group (AfDB)
African Union (AU)
African Union/United Nations Hybrid operation in Darfur (UNAMID)
Conference des Ministres des Finances des Pays de la Zone Franc (FZ)
Economic Community of West African States (ECOWAS)
Food and Agriculture Organization (FAO)
Group of 77 (G77)
International Atomic Energy Agency (IAEA)
International Bank for Reconstruction and Development (IBRD)
International Civil Aviation Organization (ICAO)
International Criminal Court (ICCt)
International Criminal Police Organization (Interpol)
International Development Association (IDA)
International Federation of Red Cross and Red Crescent Societies (IFRCS)
International Finance Corporation (IFC)
International Fund for Agricultural Development (IFAD)
International Labour Organization (ILO)
International Monetary Fund (IMF)
International Olympic Committee (IOC)
International Organization for Migration (IOM)
International Red Cross and Red Crescent Movement (ICRM)
International Telecommunication Union (ITU)
International Telecommunications Satellite Organization (ITSO)
International Trade Union Confederation (ITUC)

Inter-Parliamentary Union (IPU)
Islamic Development Bank (IDB)
Multilateral Investment Guarantee Agency (MIGA)
Nonaligned Movement (NAM)
Organisation internationale de la Francophonie (OIF)
Organisation of Islamic Cooperation (OIC)
Organisation for the Prohibition of Chemical Weapons (OPCW)
United Nations (UN)
United Nations Conference on Trade and Development (UNCTAD)
United Nations Educational, Scientific, and Cultural Organization (UNESCO)
United Nations Industrial Development Organization (UNIDO)
United Nations Mission in Liberia (UNMIL)
United Nations Mission in the Central African Republic and Chad (MINURCAT)
United Nations Mission in the Sudan (UNMIS)
United Nations Organization Mission in the Democratic Republic of the Congo (MONUC)
Universal Postal Union (UPU)
West African Development Bank (WADB) (regional)
West African Economic and Monetary Union (WAEMU)
World Customs Organization (WCO)
World Federation of Trade Unions (WFTU)
World Health Organization (WHO)
World Intellectual Property Organization (WIPO)
World Meteorological Organization (WMO)
World Tourism Organization (UNWTO)
World Trade Organization (WTO)

Law and order in Mali 

Law of Mali
 Constitution of Mali
 Human rights in Mali
 LGBT rights in Mali
 Law enforcement in Mali

Military of Mali 

Military of Mali
 Command
 Commander-in-chief:
 Forces
 Army of Mali
 Navy of Mali: None
 Air Force of Mali

Local government in Mali 

Local government in Mali

History of Mali 

History of Mali

Culture of Mali 

Culture of Mali
 Architecture of Mali
 Cuisine of Mali
 Languages of Mali
 Media in Mali
 National symbols of Mali
 Coat of arms of Mali
 Flag of Mali
 National anthem of Mali
 Public holidays in Mali
 Religion in Mali
 Hinduism in Mali
 Islam in Mali
 World Heritage Sites in Mali

Art in Mali 

 Art in Mali
 Cinema of Mali
 Music of Mali
 Television in Mali

Sports in Mali 

Sports in Mali
 Football in Mali
 Mali at the Olympics

Economy and infrastructure of Mali 

Economy of Mali
 Economic rank, by nominal GDP (2007): 131st  (one hundred and thirty first)
 Agriculture in Mali
 Communications in Mali
 Internet in Mali
 Companies of Mali
Currency of Mali: Franc
ISO 4217: XOF
 Health care in Mali
 Mining in Mali
 Stock Exchange in Mali: none – served by the regional stock exchange Bourse Régionale des Valeurs Mobilières (BRVM) in Abidjan, Côte d'Ivoire.
 Tourism in Mali
 Transport in Mali
 Airports in Mali
 Rail transport in Mali

Education in Mali 

Education in Mali

Health in Mali 

Health in Mali

See also 

Mali
Index of Mali-related articles
List of international rankings
List of Mali-related topics
Member state of the United Nations
Outline of Africa
Outline of geography

References

External links 

 Official Portal of the Government of Mali Official Portal of Government of Mali
 BBC News Country Profile - Mali
 CIA World Factbook - Mali
 

Government of Mali Tourism Site - English

Mali